As with several other districts of colonial Mozambique, the Portuguese government printed postage stamps specifically for Inhambane for several years. The first issue was for the 700th anniversary of St. Anthony of Padua in 1895, the stamps being those of Mozambique overprinted "CENTENARIO / DE / S. ANTONIO / Inhambane / MDCCCXCV". This was followed up in 1903 by a regular set featuring a portrait of King Carlos and inscribed "IMHAMBANE". The replacement of the monarchy by a republican regime in Portugal in 1910 resulted in a variety of "REPUBLICA" overprints until 1917. Subsequently, Inhambane reverted to the use of the stamps of Mozambique.

See also
 Postage stamps and postal history of Mozambique

References

Bibliography
 Cross, John K. "Inhambane." Portuguese Philatelic Society Bulletin. Nos. 105–107. (Nov. 1988-May 1989).

External links
 AskPhil – Glossary of Stamp Collecting Terms
 Encyclopaedia of Postal Authorities

Inhambane
Philately of Portugal
Philately of Mozambique